Elvin Jones Jazz Machine Live in Japan Vol. 2 is a live album by drummer Elvin Jones' Jazz Machine recorded in Japan in 1978 and originally released on the Japanese Trio label.

Track listing
 "Keiko's Birthday March" (Elvin Jones) - 15:28   
 "Bessie's Blues" (John Coltrane) - 4:37   
 "Antigua" (Roland Prince) - 15:38   
 "E.J. Blues" (Jones) - 6:50

Personnel
Elvin Jones  - drums
Pat LaBarbera - tenor saxophone
Frank Foster - tenor saxophone, soprano saxophone
Roland Prince - guitar 
Andy McCloud - bass

References

Elvin Jones live albums
1978 live albums